Running the Halls is an American television sitcom that aired on NBC's TNBC Saturday morning lineup. The series was created by Steve Slavkin. The show consisted of 13 episodes, which aired on from September 11 to December 4, 1993, and aired immediately following Saved by the Bell: The New Class during the latter show's first season.

Premise
The show followed the exploits of a group of teens attending Middlefield Academy, an East Coast boarding school, and the ongoing hijinks that occur as they experience life away from home. Los Angeles Times reviewer Lynne Heffley described the show as "buoyant" and "fun".

Cast
Richard Hillman, Jr as Andy McBain
Lackey Bevis as Molloy Simpson
Pamela Bowen as Headmistress Karen Gilman
Laurie Fortier as Holiday Friedman
Craig Kirkwood as Miles Taylor
Trevor Lissauer as David Reese
Senta Moses as Nikki Watson
Richard Speight, Jr. as Mark G. 'The Shark' Stark

Episodes

References

External links
 

1990s American high school television series
1990s American teen sitcoms
1993 American television series debuts
1993 American television series endings
English-language television shows
NBC original programming
TNBC
Television series about teenagers